SA Power Networks is the sole electricity distributor in the state of South Australia, delivering electricity from high voltage transmission network connection points operated by ElectraNet. It is the successor to the Electricity Trust of South Australia.

Ownership
SA Power Networks arose from the split up of the generation, transmission, distribution and retail responsibilities of the former SA Government-owned Electricity Trust of South Australia and its subsequent privatisation in 1999. The distribution business is owned by the Hong Kong-based Cheung Kong Infrastructure Holdings (51%), and Spark Infrastructure (49%). SA Power Networks is structured as a partnership of CKI Utilities Development Limited, PAI Utilities Development Limited, each incorporated in the Bahamas; and 
Spark Infrastructure SA (No. 1) Pty Ltd,
Spark Infrastructure SA (No. 2) Pty Ltd, and
Spark Infrastructure SA (No. 3) Pty Ltd, each incorporated in Australia.

Regulated electricity distribution
SA Power Networks operates its electricity distribution business under a licence granted by the Government of South Australia.

The business is subject to regulation by the Australian Energy Regulator and Essential Services Commission of South Australia. Regulation of the business primarily relates to establishing service standards and setting the revenue required to meet those standards cost efficiently.

SA Power Networks is the fifth largest electricity distributor in the Australian National Electricity Market (NEM). It has consistently ranked as the most efficient distributor on a State-wide basis in the NEM.

Other business activities
SA Power Networks also competes in the un-regulated energy market through its wholly owned business Enerven, which provides infrastructure construction and maintenance services to industry and government. 

SA Power Networks has employed former politician Nick Bolkus as their lobbyist in South Australia.

See also
 Australian Energy Market Operator
 Electricity Trust of South Australia
 National Electricity Market
 Spark Infrastructure

References

External links
 SA Power Networks website
 Spark Infrastructure website
 SA Power Networks inverters promise flexible solar exports, 7 Oct 2020

Companies based in Adelaide
Electric power distribution network operators in Australia